Eric Lee Kow (1912 – 7 April 1961) was a West Indian cricket umpire. He stood in nine Test matches between 1953 and 1960.

See also
 List of Test cricket umpires

References

1912 births
1961 deaths
Place of birth missing
West Indian Test cricket umpires